UTK may refer to:

 University of Tennessee, Knoxville, United States 
 Utkarsh Ambudkar (born 1983), American actor, rapper and singer 
 Special Actions Unit (Malaysia), tactical division of the Malaysian police
 Utirik Airport, Marshall Islands, Pacific Ocean